The Lighthouse Keepers (French: Gardiens de phare) is a 1929 French silent drama film directed by Jean Grémillon and starring Paul Fromet, Geymond Vital and Genica Athanasiou. It is set on the coast of Brittany where two keepers, a father and son, work a lighthouse together.

Cast
 as Père Brehan  
Geymond Vital as Yvon Bréhan  
Genica Athanasiou as Marie  
Gabrielle Fontan as Mère de Marie

References

External links

French drama films
French silent feature films
1929 drama films
Films directed by Jean Grémillon
Films set in France
French black-and-white films
Works set in lighthouses
Silent drama films
1920s French films